Bryan Morgan may refer to:

Bryan Morgan on 2010 New Year Honours
Bryan Morgan (screenwriter) of Rookies (film)

See also
Brian Morgan (disambiguation)